Gladstone is an unincorporated community in Nelson County, Virginia, United States.

Edge Hill was added to the National Register of Historic Places in 2008.

References

GNIS reference

Unincorporated communities in Nelson County, Virginia
Populated places on the James River (Virginia)